Anne Howland Ehrlich (born Anne Fitzhugh Howland; November 17, 1933) is an American senior research scientist emeritus in conservation biology in the Department of Biology at Stanford University and co-author of more than thirty books on overpopulation and ecology with her colleague and husband, Stanford professor Paul R. Ehrlich, including The Population Bomb (1968), The Stork and the Plow (1995), with Gretchen Daily, and The Dominant Animal: Human Evolution and the Environment (2008). She also has written extensively on issues of public concern such as population control, environmental protection, and environmental consequences of nuclear war.

She is seen is one of the key figures in the debate on conservation biology. The essence of her reasoning is that unlimited population growth and man's unregulated exploitation of natural resources form a serious threat to the environment. Her publications have been a significant source of inspiration to the Club of Rome. By 1993, the Ehrlichs' perspective has become the consensus view of scientists as represented by the "World Scientists' Warning to Humanity".

She co-founded the Center for Conservation Biology at Stanford University with Paul Ehrlich, where she serves as policy coordinator after being an associate director from 1987 on.

She served as one of seven outside consultants to the White House Council on Environmental Quality's Global 2000 Report (1980).

Career 
From 1952 to 1955, Anne Ehrlich attended the University of Kansas and performed scientific research on population biology, publishing numerous scientific articles. She began her scientific collaboration with Paul Ehrlich in the late 1950s through research on butterflies as a test system for answering key questions of biological classification, ecology, and evolution.

Since 1987, Anne Ehrlich has worked as associate director and policy coordinator of the Center for Conservation Biology at Stanford University.

In 1994 she received the United Nations Sasakawa Environment Prize with Paul Ehrlich and in 1995 they received the 1st Annual Heinz Award in the Environment.

In 1994 and 1995, she served on a task group for academics and scientists for the President's Commission on Sustainable Development.

She has served and serves on the board of a wide range of organizations: Friends of the Earth (1976-1985), Conferences on the Fate of the Earth (1981-1984), the Center for Innovative Diplomacy (1981–1992), Redefining Progress (1994–1996), the Ploughshares Fund (1990-2003) and the Sierra Club (1996-2002). She chaired the Sierra Club's Committee on Military Impacts on the Environment from 1985 to 1994. Until 2003 she sat on the board of advisors for the Federation for American Immigration Reform.

For ten years she was a member of the board of directors at the Center for Innovative Diplomacy, Pacific Institute, Rocky Mountain Biological Laboratory (1989-1999).  she served on the board of the Pacific Institute for Studies in Environment, Development, and Security and as of 2002 of the New-Land Foundation.

Ehrlich is involved in the Millennium Assessment of Human Behavior (MAHB) which she co-founded with husband Paul and Professor Donald Kennedy.

From 1994 on she published a series of newsletters titled "Ecofables/Ecoscience," using science to debunk myths about humans' relationship to the environment.

Personal life 
Ehrlich was born in Des Moines, Iowa, the daughter of Virginia Lippincott (Fitzhugh) Howland and Winston Densmore. Throughout her childhood she was fascinated by nature, preferring to be outside learning about wildflowers and geography. As a teenager she read Our Plundered Planet by Fairfield Osborn, Columbia University professor of zoology, member of the wildlife conservation organization Boone and Crockett Club and fossil collector. She was influenced by his critique of humankind's poor stewardship of Earth and its environmental destruction by humans.

She married Paul R. Ehrlich in 1954. The couple has one daughter, Lisa, born in 1955. The Population Bomb has been devoted to Lisa, and The Population Explosion to their grandchildren.

Writings

The Population Bomb (1968) 
The wordings "the population bomb" have first been used in a widely distributed 1958 pamphlet by advertising professional and entrepreneur Hugh Moore. The original edition of The Population Bomb began with this statement:

The Ehrlichs argued that the human population was too great, and that while the extent of disaster could be mitigated, humanity could not prevent severe famines, the spread of disease, social unrest, and other negative consequences of overpopulation. By the end of the 1970s, this prediction proved to be incorrect. However, they continued to argue that societies must take strong action to decrease population growth in order to mitigate future disasters, both ecological and social.

The Population Explosion (1990) 
In their sequel to The Population Bomb, the Ehrlichs purport to describe how the world's growing population dwarfs the Earth's capacity to sustain current living standards and why overpopulation is a number one environmental problem. The book calls for action to confront population growth and the ensuing crisis:
While the Ehrlichs concede that consumption and technology must also share the blame for environmental crises, priority should be given to achieving population control as a means of stopping further destruction. "Rapid population growth in poor nations is an important reason they stay poor, and overpopulation in those nations will greatly increase their destructive impact on the environment as they struggle to develop,".

Optimum Human Population Size (1994) 
In this paper, the Ehrlichs discuss their opinion on the 'optimal size' for human population, given current technological realities. They refer to establishing "social policies to influence fertility rates."

The Stork and the Plow (1995) 
A well-reasoned book of how poverty forces unsustainable use of natural resources, with proposals how food production might stay ahead of population growth, together with Gretchen C. Daily. The authors look at the interaction between population and food supply and offer a strategy for balancing human numbers with nutritional needs. Their proposals include improving the status of women by giving them equal education, reducing racism and religious prejudice, reforming the agricultural system, and shrinking the growing gap between rich and poor.

One With Nineveh (2005) 
The title refers to Rudyard Kipling's 1897 poem "Recessional", "Lo, all our pomp of yesterday / Is one with Nineveh and Tyre!", alluding to the arrogance that went before the fall of historic Mesopotamian civilizations. Named a Notable Book for 2005 by the American Library Association, Ehrlich offers a lucid synthesis of the major issues of our time: rising consumption, still-growing world population, and unchecked political and economic inequity. Grounded in science, economics, and history, she puts political and environmental debates in a larger context and formulates a range of possible solutions for improving our future prospect, from local actions to reform of national government to international initiatives.

The Dominant Animal (2008) 
The Ehrlichs in this popular book explore in a unique way how humans have evolved from vulnerable creatures clawing nourishment from Earth to a sophisticated global society manipulating every inch of it: they have become the dominant animal. They question why we are creating a world that threatens our own species and offer suggestions what can we do to change the current trajectory.

Can a collapse of global civilization be avoided? (2013) 
This report reminds of how the collapse of numerous civilizations have, in the past, been caused by the degradation of nature, and how that process in present times makes a global collapse appearing likely. Overpopulation, overconsumption by the rich and poor choices of technologies are major drivers; dramatic cultural change provides the main hope of averting calamity.

Awards and honors 

 Raymond B. Bragg Award for Distinguished Service, Honorary Life Member 1985
 Named to Global 500 Roll of Honour for Environmental Achievement, United Nations, 1989
 Honorary Degree Doctor of Law, Bethany College, 1990
 The United Nations Sasakawa Environment Prize (jointly with Paul R. Ehrlich and shared with M.S. Swaminathan), 1994
 The 1st Annual Heinz Award in the Environment (with Paul Ehrlich), 1995
 Nuclear Age Peace Award (with Paul Ehrlich) honored by the Nuclear Age Peace Foundation of Santa Barbara, California (1996).The awards were presented to them by ocean environmentalist Jean-Michel Cousteau.
 1998 Tyler Prize for Environmental Achievement (with Paul Ehrlich) - The Prize has been awarded for exemplary scientific contributions to understanding the environmental consequences of species extinction, habitat destruction and nuclear war, individually and jointly, and for raising public awareness of and shaping public opinion on resource depletion and environmental degradation. "They were among the first to effectively communicate how to apply science to the solution of society's problems,"
 Fellow of the American Academy Arts & Sciences, California Academy of Sciences (honorary)
 Honory Doctorate of Oregon State University, 1999

Bibliography
Selected works, jointly authored with colleague and husband Paul Ehrlich:

 The Population Bomb: Population Control or Race to Oblivion? (1968), New York: Ballantine Books
 Population, Resources, Environment: Issues in Human Ecology Second Edition (1972) San Francisco: WH Freeman and Company
 Human Ecology: Problems and Solutions (1973) San Francisco: WH Freeman and Company
 Ecoscience: Population, Resources, Environment" (1978), with John Holdren, San Francisco: WH Freeman and Company
 Extinction: The Causes and Consequences of the Disappearance of Species (1981), New York: Random House
 Earth (1987), New York: Franklin Watts
 The Population Explosion (1990), Simon & Schuster
 Healing the Planet: Strategies for Resolving the Environmental Crisis (1991), Addison-Wesley
 The Stork and The Plow: The Equity Answer to the Human Dilemma (1995) with Gretchen C. Daily, G.P. Putnam's Sons; New Haven, London: Yale University Press
 Betrayal of Science and Reason: How Anti-Environment Rhetoric Threatens Our Future (1998), Washington: Island Press
 One With Nineveh: Politics, Consumption, and the Human Future (2004), Washington: Island Press
 The Dominant Animal: Human Evolution and the Environment (2008), Washington: Island Press
 Can a collapse of global civilization be avoided? A Royal Society Report (2013), London
 The Annihilation of Nature: Human Extinction of Birds and Mammals (2015), with Gerardo Ceballos
 Returning to "Normal"? Evolutionary Roots of the Human Prospect (2022, paper), Millennium Alliance for Humanity and the Biosphere

See also 

 Paul R. Ehrlich
 Ecosystem valuation

References

External links
 Stanford bio/c.v.
 Center for Conservation Biology - Stanford University - Biography (2006)
 Center for Conservation Biology, Stanford University website
 The Millennium Alliance for Humanity and the Biosphere (MAHB) website

1933 births
Living people
American biologists
American women biologists
American ecologists
Women ecologists
American environmentalists
American women environmentalists
Sierra Club directors
American non-fiction environmental writers
Ehrlich, Anne Howland
Activists from the San Francisco Bay Area
20th-century American non-fiction writers
21st-century American non-fiction writers
20th-century American women writers
21st-century American women writers
Women science writers
People in public health
American women non-fiction writers